The Alexander Dennis Enviro200 MMC (sold as the Alexander Dennis Enviro200) is a single-decker city bus produced by Alexander Dennis since 2014, as the successor to the Enviro200 midibus and Enviro300 full-size bus. The first Enviro200 MMCs entered service with National Express West Midlands in 2015. Notably, Enviro200 MMCs have been modified by Fusion Processing to be used as the basis for the first driverless bus trials in the United Kingdom.

The Enviro200 MMC is available over a range of lengths, including 8.9 metres, 9.7 metres, 10.4 metres, 10.8 metres and 11.5/11.8 metres, as an integral twin-axle midibus or full-size bus. Additionally, the 12.7 metre tri-axle Enviro200 XLB is offered in the New Zealand market. The Enviro200 MMC bodywork is also available as an all-electric bus, known as the Enviro200EV, built on a BYD Auto battery electric chassis.

Introduction 
The Enviro200 MMC can trace its lineage back to the original Dennis Dart midibus, introduced by Dennis Specialist Vehicles in 1989. One of the most successful bus models of all time, the original Dart was replaced by the low-floor Dart SLF in 1996. Through financial difficulties at the various parent companies, production of the Dart SLF passed first to TransBus International in 2001 and subsequently to Alexander Dennis in 2004.

The second-generation Alexander Dennis Enviro200 - then branded as the Enviro200 Dart - was introduced as the Dart SLF's replacement in 2006, based very strongly on the design of the previous model. The third-generation Enviro200 was launched in 2009, followed by the Enviro200 MMC in 2015. Production of the classic third-generation Enviro200 ultimately ceased in late 2018.

Variants

Enviro200 MMC 

Alexander Dennis unveiled the Enviro200 MMC (short for Major Model Change) at the Euro Bus Expo in Birmingham in November 2014. As well as replacing the classic Enviro200, it also superseded the Enviro300. The first production examples of the Enviro200 MMC entered service with National Express West Midlands in 2015, the operator having ordered 50 of the type.

Go South Coast were early customers of the Enviro200 MMC, with a first batch of 18 delivered to Bluestar in late 2015. Twelve more were delivered to Bluestar in 2016, followed by a third batch in 2019, some of which had air filters mounted on the roof following successful trials in Southampton. Swindon's Bus Company had 13 Enviro200 MMCs delivered in 2017, followed by another batch of six in 2020, and Morebus had 41 Enviro200 MMCs delivered in 2018 for services between Bournemouth and Poole.

The Stagecoach Group, the founders of which were shareholders of Alexander Dennis until 2019, operate a large number of Enviro200 MMCs across the group's operations in England, Wales and Scotland. After a first batch of eight built to Transport for London specification entered service with Stagecoach London in October 2015, Stagecoach's first regional Enviro200 MMCs entered service with Stagecoach South, Stagecoach East Scotland, Stagecoach Oxfordshire and Stagecoach Yorkshire between November 2015 and February 2016. Further examples have entered service with Stagecoach North East, who received eighteen for services in Newcastle upon Tyne in December 2016, Stagecoach East Midlands, where Enviro200 MMCs were introduced for services in Lincoln and Hull as well as on the Humber Fastcat service to Scunthorpe, and Stagecoach South West, where 14 Enviro200 MMCs entered service in Exeter in 2018. Some delivered to Stagecoach have been built to the company's high standard Stagecoach Gold specification, with 24 such Enviro200 MMCs delivered to Stagecoach South Wales in 2016, and another 25 being delivered to Stagecoach Midlands in 2018.

The FirstGroup are another significant operator of Enviro200 MMCs, making significant purchases of the type throughout 2015 and 2016. 32 Enviro200 MMCs were delivered to First Glasgow in November 2015 as part of a larger vehicle investment for the city, followed by the delivery of seven high-specification Enviro200 MMCs in January 2016 to upgrade First Aberdeen's route 13 to 'Platinum' specification. Smaller batches of Enviro200 MMCs were also delivered to First South Yorkshire for services in Sheffield, First Essex, First Potteries, First Cymru and for First Glasgow's express services to Glasgow Airport.

Arriva UK Bus also operate a number of Enviro200 MMCs. The company first took on Enviro200 MMCs in early 2016, which were delivered to Arriva London for service on route B13. The first orders for an Arriva subsidiary outside London was delivered to Arriva Shires & Essex in 2017, with 14 of the type delivered for services in Luton. Elsewhere in 2017, Yorkshire Tiger launched six Enviro200 MMCs for 'Flying Tiger' services connecting Bradford and Harrogate with Leeds Bradford Airport.

Wellglade Group companies Trent Barton and Kinchbus had 136 Enviro200 MMCs in total delivered between 2016 and 2020. These buses were delivered in various route-branded liveries, such as for the 'Skylink' service to East Midlands Airport, and all feature high-specification interiors.

Nine Enviro200 MMCs were delivered to East Yorkshire Motor Services across two batches in 2017. Following the company's acquisition by Go North East, a pair of Enviro200 MMCs were delivered for two rural services in 2019 and eight more were delivered to Scarborough for the 'Scarborough Sevens' operation later that year. This was accompanied by deliveries of 11 Enviro200 MMCs to Go North East for its 'Green Arrow' service.

Transdev Blazefield first took five Enviro200 MMCs for its York & Country operation in 2019 after the company won five service contracts in York. A further 13 Enviro200 MMCs with high specification interiors were delivered to the Blackburn Bus Company in January 2020.

Other operators include McGills Bus Services, who took delivery of 26 Enviro200 MMCs in 2019, with 15 of the batch specified to be built to 11.5m length while the remaining eleven were specified to 10.4m length. 44 were also delivered to Go Cornwall Bus in 2020, shortly after the launch of the company's new tendered bus network. Two pairs of Enviro200 MMCs were purchased on lease to Thames Valley Buses in 2022, while Cardiff Bus ordered ten Enviro200 MMCs in 2017.

The Enviro200 MMC is also popular with independently-run companies, many of which are either bought outright or leased to the operator through lessors such as Mistral. Among these include Moffat and Williamson of Fife, who took seven in 2017, Delaine Buses, who purchase two annually and operate five of the type as of September 2022, Edwards Coaches, Whitelaws Coaches, Go Goodwins, and Kev's Cars and Coaches.

Enviro200EV 

Alexander Dennis and BYD Auto jointly launched the Enviro200EV battery electric bus in 2015. Badged as a BYD bus, the Enviro200EV utilises BYD's own  chassis and drivetrain, with batteries stored on the roof of the modified Enviro200 MMC body, and has a range of up to 200 miles with a recharge time of 3.5 hours. A shorter  variant was subsequently added to the range in 2016.

Go-Ahead London were the launch customer for the Enviro200EV, where after trialling two integral BYD K9 electric buses, ordered 51 of the type in July 2015 for use on routes 507 and 521. Further deliveries included 14 examples for route 360, and 30 more in 2018 for use on routes 153 and 214, and in 2020 for route 360 and 484. Other Transport for London operators of Enviro200EVs include London United, who operate 100 of the type which were delivered across two batches in 2018 and 2021, Metroline, who purchased 23 Enviro200EVs for use on route 46, and Stagecoach London, who purchased five of the first Enviro200EVs to feature a redesigned roof layout for service on route 323.

Outside London, the first 12 Enviro200EVs to enter service outside of the capital were delivered to Arriva Merseyside in 2017. Nine Enviro200EVs were delivered to Stagecoach South for use in Guildford on 'Glide' park and ride services in January 2019, and in 2021, nine Enviro200EVs were delivered to Stagecoach East Scotland for service in Perth. Three Enviro200EVs were also delivered to Salisbury Reds in 2020 for park and ride services in Salisbury.

Four Enviro200EVs have been delivered to Nottinghamshire County Council for their 'Nottsbus' scheme. The first two 10.8 m examples were delivered in 2018, then in 2021, the first pair of 10.2 m examples on order entered service under contract to Stagecoach in Mansfield in December 2021. 

First Glasgow initially had two Enviro200EVs delivered on a trial basis in January 2020. This was followed by an order for 22 more of the type in March 2021, which prior to entering public service in November, were used as shuttle buses at the 2021 United Nations Climate Change Conference being held in the city, followed by an order for 50 more Enviro200 EVs for delivery in 2023. Elsewhere in Glasgow, three dual-door Enviro200EVs were delivered by National Car Parks in 2019 for car park shuttle services at Glasgow Airport.

The National Transport Authority of Ireland have ordered 200 Enviro200EVs to be delivered to operators across Ireland over a period of five years, specified at 12 m length with dual doors and spaces for wheelchairs and prams. Deliveries commenced in January 2023, with the first 11 Enviro200EVs entering service with Bus Éireann in Athlone.

In New Zealand, eight Enviro200EVs were delivered to Auckland Transport operator Fullers360 in late 2020 for services connecting the Auckland Region's Waiheke Island.

Enviro200 XLB 

In 2017, a 12.8 metre tri-axle version of the Enviro200 MMC, named the Enviro200 XLB, was launched for the New Zealand market. Significant investment in the vehicle type has been seen across the country, with Ritchies Transport purchasing 28 for their Auckland operations, and Birkenhead Transport acquiring 25 examples.

A demonstrator EV variant of the tri-axle was delivered in August 2021 to Auckland Transport. It is built on the BYD K9 Chassis with the same technology as its two-axle variant and Auckland Transport has partnered with Mercury Energy and Ritchies Transport to trial the use of the bus on different services. This is part of their goal to decarbonise their bus fleet by 2035.

Autonomous trials 

The first autonomous bus trial in the United Kingdom commenced in mid-2019, with an Enviro200 MMC modified with SAE Level 4 autonomous software from Fusion Processing able to operate in driverless mode within Stagecoach Manchester's Sharston bus depot, performing tasks such as driving to the washing station, refuelling point and then parking up at a dedicated parking space in the depot.

The first passenger-carrying driverless bus service in the United Kingdom, named CAVForth, is to commence using a fleet of five Enviro200 MMCs near-identical to the Manchester trial on a  Stagecoach Fife park-and-ride route across the Forth Road Bridge, from the north bank of the Forth to Edinburgh Park station. The pilot service, partly funded by the UK government's Centre for Connected and Autonomous Vehicles (CCAV), will see twenty personnel recruited by Stagecoach to monitor the autonomous systems and demonstrate the buses operating without a driver in the cab. Non-passenger testing of these autonomous buses along the park-and-ride route commenced for a period of two weeks in April 2022; passengers were first carried on the buses during further testing in January 2023.

See also 

 List of buses
 Alexander Dennis

References

External links 

Alexander Dennis product descriptions for Enviro200 range

Enviro200 MMC
Battery electric buses
Low-floor buses
Midibuses
Tri-axle buses
Vehicles introduced in 2014